Kristian Mandrup Elster (4 March 1841 – 11 April 1881) was a Norwegian novelist, journalist, literary critic and theatre critic.

Biography
He was born at Overhalla in  Nord-Trøndelag, Norway. He was the son of Christen Christensen Elster (1804–1891) and Elen Sophie Alstrup (1811–1889). In 1853 the family moved to Førde in Sunnfjord. At age 15, he was sent to Christiania to attend school. In 1867, he traveled to Germany  to receive training as a forester at Giessen.  From 1869 to 1873, he lived in Christiania where he work as a literary and theater critic. From 1873, he was employed as a forester first in Valdres and  then in Trondheim where he resided until he died of pneumonia in 1881 at age 40.

He was married in 1874 to  Sanna Fasting (1845–1926) and was the father of Kristian Elster the Younger (1881-1947).
He made his literary début with the historical drama Eystein Meyla, which was staged in 1863. Among his novels are Tora Trondal from 1879, and  Farlige folk from 1881.

Selected works
Tora Trondal, 1879
Farlige Folk, 1881
Solskyer, 1881
Samlede Skrifterbd. 1–2, 1898

References

External links 

 
 
Digitized books by Elster in the National Library of Norway

1841 births
1881 deaths
People from Overhalla
Norwegian theatre critics
Norwegian literary critics
19th-century Norwegian journalists
Male journalists
19th-century Norwegian novelists
Norwegian male novelists
19th-century Norwegian male writers